Kamal Meattle is an Indian environmental activist and CEO of Paharpur Business Centre & Software Technology Incubator Park based in New Delhi, India. Meattle held a talk at TED 2009 entitled How to Grow Your Own Fresh Air.

Attributions 
After becoming allergic to New Delhi's polluted air in 1992, Meattle claimed to have discovered that three common houseplants could help reduce the pollutants in the air. The three plants and their properties are listed below:

Areca palm (Chrysalidocarpus lutescens) 
Works well in the day time
Great for living areas
One needs about 4 shoulder-high plants/person
Needs to be put outdoors once every 3–4 months
The leaves of the plant need to be wiped every day in Delhi and perhaps once a week in a cleaner city
The soil used should be of vermi manure or use hydroponics

Mother-in-law's tongue (Sansevieria trifasciata) 
Converts CO2 into O2 at night
One requires about 6–8 such waist-high plants per person in the bedroom
Leaves need to be wiped in the same way as the Areca Palm
The soil used should be of vermi manure or use hydroponics

Money plant (Epipremnum aureum) 
Excellent for removing formaldehyde and other volatile organic compounds
Best grown using hydroponics

Meattle does not provide any numerical data to support his claims, nor is there third-party confirmation of the results, but at least one study calls the hypothesis into question.

See also
NASA Clean Air Study, where all three plants are listed

References

Businesspeople from Delhi
Living people
Year of birth missing (living people)